"Hootie" is a nickname for the following people:

 Hootie Ingram (born 1933), former Clemson University head football coach
 William "Hootie" Johnson (born 1931), former chairman of Augusta National Golf Club
 Jay McShann (1916–2006), American jazz pianist and bandleader
 Darius Rucker (born 1966), lead vocalist of Hootie & the Blowfish

Lists of people by nickname